Laccophilus uniformis, is a species of predaceous diving beetle found in India, Andaman & Nicobar Islands, Bangladesh, Myanmar, Sri Lanka, Cambodia, China, Indonesia, Laos, Thailand, and Vietnam.

References 

Dytiscidae
Insects of Sri Lanka
Insects described in 1859